The Lopori river is a river in the Democratic Republic of the Congo. The Lopori, and the Maringa River to the south, join near Basankusu to form the Lulonga River, a tributary of the Congo River.
The Lopori / Maringa basin is called the Maringa-Lopori-Wamba forest Landscape, an area of great ecological importance.

References

Rivers of the Democratic Republic of the Congo
Congo drainage basin